Colonial Gardens is a former entertainment complex located in the Kenwood Hill neighborhood across New Cut Road from Iroquois Park in Louisville, Kentucky. In its early existence, it was a part of  Senning's Park, the site of the first zoo in Louisville.

Beginnings as Senning's Park
Senning's Park was started in 1902 by a German immigrant to Louisville from Kesse, Germany named Frederick Carl Senning, who immigrated to the city in 1868. Prior to opening the park, he and his wife Minnie founded the Senning Hotel at 2nd and Jefferson in downtown Louisville, as well as the first bowling alley in Louisville, at the corner of 8th and Main, also in downtown.

The park started on two and a half acres owned by Fredrika Oswald before he died. It benefited from being only a block from the loop that electric streetcars used on Fourth Street. Initially it did not have a zoo, but instead focused on dancing and dining; picnics and political rallies were common at the facility.

The zoo was started during the Prohibition era, and barely survived the Great Depression. In 1920, the Sennings' son William began the zoo operations, with his parents going on a trip to Europe. Animals present in the zoo included alligators, bears, deer, exotic birds, leopards, lions, monkeys, ostriches (for riding), and tigers. However, the keep of the exotic animals became expensive, and in 1939 the park was closed due to Frederick Senning's death. The park was sold at auction for $15,000 the following year. The new owner, B. A. Watson, opened a restaurant on the property called Colonial Gardens, and promptly closed the zoo. Its successor, the current Louisville Zoo, would not open until 1969.

Colonial Gardens (1940–present)

Colonial Gardens featured big bands during the 1940s. However, it had its own difficulties as well; it lost its right to sell rationed foods in 1944, and was found to have an illegal gambling device on the premises on January 13, 1948. A fire on August 16, 1950 caused $10,000 in damages. In the 1950s it served as both a hangout for teens, as well as a bar. Jerry Lee Lewis is said to have performed at the restaurant; also, local oral history holds that Elvis Presley had an unscheduled performance at the restaurant in 1956, as it was close to the home of his grandparents, whom he was visiting at the time.

The last business operating in Colonial Gardens closed in 2003, and the building was then abandoned by its owners. By mid-2008, it was in danger of being demolished by investors interested in developing the property. In hopes of saving the building, a petition to declare the building and adjacent property an "Individual Local Landmark" was begun simultaneously. One rationale for the petition, among several other historical distinctions, was the fact that the building was the last of the beer gardens that once dominated the South end of Louisville. On November 20, 2008, the petition was passed, and the Louisville Metro Landmarks Commission named Colonial Gardens an Individual Local Landmark.

In 2012, Louisville Metro Council member David Yates proposed an ordinance to change how the commission designates an individual local landmark, so residents in the immediate vicinity of the property in question would have more input in the commission's decisions, such as the one regarding Colonial Gardens. The ordinance also would give the council final decision authority. In August, the ordinance was passed 18–7 over Mayor Greg Fischer's veto.

In June 2013, in a 16–3 vote, the Metro Council approved an ordinance allowing the city to purchase the Colonial Gardens property. The city subsequently sold the property to local developer Underhill Associates for $1 and gave $1.2 million toward the property's redevelopment.

In 2017, Underhill Associates began construction on the $5 million redevelopment of Colonial Gardens and surrounding property, including renovating  in the original building, demolishing a 1939 addition, and building three new one-story buildings. These buildings will be used to house three additional restaurants, which the developer prefers to be locally owned and mid-priced. though this was delayed to August. 
In April of 2021 the last restaurant B.A. Colonial which was named after the second owner B.A. Watson opened its doors in the original corner building completing the project and carrying on the rich traditions of the South End and the historic property.

See also
 Iroquois, Louisville
 Little Loomhouse
 List of attractions and events in the Louisville metropolitan area

References

External links
 Official Colonial Gardens Facebook Page - Tracking development, linking businesses, sharing events.
 Colonial Gardens Local Landmark Designation Report - Louisville Metro Historic Landmarks and Preservation Districts Commission (>3MB)
 Celebrating Louisville's Colonial Gardens — Facebook page tracking Colonial Garden developments since 2010

Buildings and structures in Louisville, Kentucky
German-American culture in Louisville, Kentucky
Local landmarks in Louisville, Kentucky
Defunct companies based in Louisville, Kentucky
History of Louisville, Kentucky
Zoos in Kentucky 
Former zoos
Former music venues in the United States
Beer gardens in the United States  
Entertainment companies established in 1940
Entertainment companies disestablished in 2003
Articles needing infobox zoo
Beer in Kentucky
1940 establishments in Kentucky
2003 disestablishments in Kentucky